Taang! Records is an independent record label with a roster of hardcore punk, punk rock, Oi!, power pop, ska, indie rock, psychedelic, and ambient artists and bands founded by Curtis Casella in Boston, Massachusetts in 1983.

History 
Taang! Records started as a singles-only label, recording acts in Boston's early hardcore and punk scene such as Gang Green, Negative FX, the Mighty Mighty Bosstones, and The Lemonheads. The name is an acronym for the phrase "Teen Agers Are No Good!" The label gained prominence with the rise of Boston hardcore in the punk culture of the 1980s which had strong ties to the scene in nearby Washington D.C. the strong popularity of the 45 rpm format in the punk and indie underground scene, and the strong network of independent distribution, zines, retail outlets, and college radio stations that had already developed around the format. By the early 1990s, the label developed close ties to the punk scene in Southern California and moved its headquarters to San Diego, where it remains. Today, the Taang! catalogue includes over 200 releases in multiple formats, with international distribution.

1983 to 1993 
Curtis Casella, a Boston native, started Taang! to promote the burgeoning Boston hardcore punk scene. 
“In the early 80's, frustrated with the scene in Boston with all the greatest bands in the USA I felt that there should a place they could call home. No one else was doing it. Washington, DC had Dischord, UK. had No Future, Clay & Secret and Crass, LA had SST, Boston needed Taang!" The label's first full-length release was Negative FX's self-titled album, which was recorded in 1982.

In 1986, Taang! released five vinyl titles: Burning in Water by Moving Targets, Back on the Map by Slapshot, Another Wasted Night by Gang Green, the 7-inch Mine Caroline by The Oysters, and a bonus 7-inch by The Lemonheads. Gang Green's Another Wasted Night spawned three videos that received MTV play, and their non-stop tour propelled sales of their release to upwards of 30,000 units. The label achieved wide airplay on college radio stations with releases from The Lemonheads and Bullet LaVolta, and expanded its repertoire to include acts with a more diverse sound such as Poison Idea, The Mighty Mighty Bosstones, Swirlies and Spacemen 3.

In 1992, Taang! produced an archival release of early material from San Diego hardcore band Battalion of Saints. Casella, who had been dividing his time between Los Angeles and Boston, moved the label's headquarters to Mission Beach, San Diego and simultaneously opened a retail outlet in Hollywood. Shortly after moving to San Diego, Taang! issued two releases by local ska band Buck-O-Nine (the album Barfly and the EP Water In My Head), which was spurred on by a national tour in support of the ska band The Specials.

1994 to 1999
In the mid- to late 1990s, there were no new signings and the label focused primarily on archival releases by bands such as: Cock Sparrer (four releases), The Adicts (three releases), The Business (seven releases), The Exploited (two releases), The Boys (two releases), Last Resort, The Ruts, Slaughter and The Dogs, and Stiff Little Fingers (two releases), a total of twenty-six releases over five years.

2001 to 2006 
While operating in California, the label continued its focus on Boston-based bands.
Full catalogue releases were produced for the Proletariat, Bruisers and The F.U.s. Bands such as Gang Green, Slapshot and Poison Idea, which had previously left Taang! for other labels returned, each producing new releases for the label.

2007 to 2012 
In 2007, the label started to sign more new bands, including Everybody Out!, featuring Rick Barton of Dropkick Murphys, Bill Close of The Freeze and Sweeney Todd of The Dead Pets as well as Southern California's Evacuate, led by Mike Virus of Cheap Sex and The Virus, who released their debut in 2009. Taang! also released a DVD from Cheap Sex from San Diego.

An addition to the label in this period was Negative Approach.  Marking the label's 200th release was their work Friends of No One, a lost six-song recording from 1984 that was discovered in 2009 in a basement in Detroit. Taang!'s next released Nothing Will Stand In Our Way, a full album by the band, which focused on its earliest recordings (a total of 53 songs). 
In 2011 the label released works by two legendary bands from the San Francisco Bay area – Attitude Adjustment and Part Time Christians.  Both releases contained the bands' complete recorded works and were released digitally as well as on vinyl editions.
Attitude Adjustment released a new recording entitled No Way Back in 2012.

2013 to present 
In 2013, the label announced plans to release a series of more than fifty vinyl records from its catalogue over the span of 10 years.  In April 2014, the label released The First 10 Singles 1984-88, 7" Vinyl Box Set to celebrate the Boston-based punk label's 30th anniversary. Included in the boxset were ten seven-inch discs. Each disc included a full re-creation of the original jacket except for the Oysters which was redone for this box set. There was also a 24-song CD that combined all of the musical selections. This vinyl boxset was limited to 2,000 numbered copies. The bands featured were Gang Green, Last Rights, Stranglehold, Noonday, Underground, Last Stand, Negative FX, Oysters, Lemonheads, Moving Targets, and Slapshot. There are plans to release the singles box set as an LP version as well as a CD in 2021.
The label also released the KILLER OF SHEEP from Pittsburgh PA. As well as NEGATIVE APPROACH original mix of their only Lp titled Tied Down From 1983 along with a newly recorded track with the current LINE UP

Artists

 The Adicts
 Anti-Heros
 Attitude Adjustment
 Battalion of Saints
 Ben Deily
 The Boys
 The Bruisers
 Buck-O-Nine
 Bullet LaVolta
 The Business
 Brandon Cruz
 Ken Chambers
 Cheap Sex
 Cock Sparrer
 D.Y.S.
 The Dickies
 Dicky B Hardy
 Dropkick Murphys
 Evacuate
 Everybody Out!
 The Exploited
 Eye For An Eye
 The F.U.'s
 Forced Reality
 The Freeze
 The 4-Skins
 Gang Green
 Hard-Ons
 Jerry's Kids
 Kilslug
 Last Resort
 Last Rights
 Last Stand
 The Lemonheads
 Keith Levene
 Lyres
 Maelstrom
 Menace
 The Mighty Mighty Bosstones
 Mission of Burma
 Moving Targets
 Negative Approach
 Negative FX
 The Newtown Neurotics
 Oysters
 Part Time Christians
 Poison Idea
 The Proletariat
 Rat City Riot
 Reverberation
 The Ruts
 Sam Black Church
 Seka
 Slapshot
 Slaughter & The Dogs
 Sloppy Seconds
 Spacemen 3
 Spore
 SSD
 Stars & Stripes
 Stiff Little Fingers
 Stranglehold
 Swirlies
 The Titanics
 Upsidedown Cross
 The Worthless

See also
 List of record labels

References

External links
 
 Taang! Records at Discog.com

Punk record labels
Record labels established in 1984
Ska record labels